The 2006 Oceania Swimming Championships took place from 7–16 July at 3 locations in Queensland, Australia. This was the sixth edition of the Championships, and featured competitions in: 
swimming—7, 8, 10 + 12 July at Trinity Anglican School in Cairns;
open water swimming—9 + 12 July at Palm Cove Beach;
synchronized swimming (synchro) -- 14–16 July at Chandler Pool in Brisbane.

All swimming competition listed below were swum in a 50m (long-course) pool.

Participating countries

Event schedule
The swimming and open water schedules are below. Synchronized swimming was held 14–16 July.

*Finals-order shown for swimming. Prelims/semifinals/finals were swum in the 50s and 100; prelims/finals were swum in the 200s and 400s; and the women's 800 and men's 1500 were timed finals (i.e. each swimmer swims once; fastest heat swims at night). Morning session (prelims) began at 9:30 a.m.; evening session (semifinals & finals) began at 6:30 p.m.

Results

Swimming

Men

Women

Open Water medalist

Synchro medalists

Overall medal table

References

Oceania Swimming Championships, 2006
Swim
Oceania Swimming Championships, 2006
Oceania Swimming Championships
Swimming competitions in Australia
International aquatics competitions hosted by Australia
July 2006 sports events in Australia